The 2022 FIVB Volleyball Men's World Championship featured 24 teams. Two places were allocated to the host, Russia, and the current titleholder, Poland. Ten places will be allocated to the top two teams from each of the 2021 Continental Championships that have not yet qualified as host or titleholder. Remaining places will be allocated to the top twelve teams in the FIVB World Ranking that have not yet qualified through the first three criteria.

Qualification summary

Qualified teams
a 
b 
c

Timelines

Host country
FIVB reserved a berth for the 2022 FIVB Volleyball Men's World Championship host country to participate in the tournament.

 VFR originally qualified as host country, but the team was removed due to 2022 Russian invasion of Ukraine.
 has been invited to replace Russia in the competition line up as the next highest ranked team in the World Ranking.

FIVB announced that  Poland and  Slovenia will host the relocated 2022 FIVB Volleyball Men's World Championship on 15 April 2022.

Defending champions
FIVB reserved a berth for the 2018 FIVB Volleyball Men's World Championship champions to participate in the tournament.

 from CEV (Europe)

AVC (Asia and Oceania)

Final positions (2021 Asian Championship)

Preliminary round

Pool A

Pool B

Pool C

Pool D

Classification round

Pool E

Pool F

Play-offs finals
Winners qualified for 2022 World Championship

|}

CAVB (Africa)

Final positions (2021 African Championship)

Preliminary round

Pool A

Pool B

Pool C

Pool D

Play-offs semifinals
Winners qualified for Play-offs finals

|}

Play-offs finals
Winners qualified for 2022 World Championship

|}

CEV (Europe)

Final positions (2021 European Championship)

Preliminary round

Pool A

Pool B

Pool C

Pool D

Play-offs quarterfinals
Winners qualified for Play-offs semifinals

|}

Play-offs semifinals
Winners qualified for Play-offs finals

|}

Play-offs finals
Winners qualified for 2022 World Championship

|}

CSV (South America)

Final positions (2021 South American Championship)

Round robin

NORCECA (North America)

Final positions (2021 NORCECA Championship)

Preliminary round

Pool A

Source: NORCECA

Pool B

Source: NORCECA

Play-offs semifinals
Winners qualified for Play-offs finals

|}

Play-offs finals
Winners qualified for 2022 World Championship

|}

References

External links
Fédération Internationale de Volleyball – official website

qualification
2022